Super D is an EP by Ben Folds, the last of 3 in a series released between Rockin' the Suburbs and Songs for Silverman. It has three original songs and two covers: The Darkness' "Get Your Hands Off My Woman", and a live performance of Ray Charles' "Them That Got", included as a tribute to Charles who had recently died. Folds wrote "Kalamazoo" when he was 19, and knocked it around for years on demo tapes before inclusion here, adding a disco-like string section "because [he] could". "Adelaide" is an affectionate piece inspired by Adelaide, South Australia where Folds once made his home. The song became a hit in Australia, reaching #37 on the Triple J Hottest 100 that year. Ben Folds' ex-wife, Frally Hynes, is featured on the album cover.

Track listing

References

Ben Folds EPs
2004 EPs